Wayne Robert Cowley (born December 4, 1964) is a Canadian-born British retired professional ice hockey goaltender who played in one game in the National Hockey League for the Edmonton Oilers during the 1993–94 season, on December 11, 1993 against the New Jersey Devils. The rest of his career, which lasted from 1988 to 2000, was mainly spent in the minor leagues, though he also played several years in the United Kingdom and Germany. Cowley became a naturalized British citizen and played for the British national team at the 2000 World Championships.

Career statistics

Regular season and playoffs

International

See also
 List of players who played only one game in the NHL

External links
 

1964 births
Living people
Canadian expatriate ice hockey players in England
Canadian expatriate ice hockey players in Germany
Canadian expatriate ice hockey players in the United States
Canadian ice hockey goaltenders
Cape Breton Oilers players
Cincinnati Cyclones (ECHL) players
Colgate Raiders men's ice hockey players
Edmonton Oilers players
Flint Generals players
Las Vegas Flash players
Milwaukee Admirals (IHL) players
Newcastle Cobras players
Newcastle Riverkings players
Raleigh IceCaps players
Salt Lake Golden Eagles (IHL) players
Sheffield Steelers players
Sportspeople from Scarborough, Toronto
Ice hockey people from Toronto
Undrafted National Hockey League players
Wedemark Scorpions players
Wheeling Thunderbirds players
Worcester IceCats players